The women's long jump event at the 2014 World Junior Championships in Athletics was held in Eugene, Oregon, USA, at Hayward Field on 22 and 23 July.

Medalists

Results

Final
23 July
Start time: 19:03  Temperature: 18 °C  Humidity: 56 %
End time: 20:35  Temperature: 17 °C  Humidity: 63 %

Qualifications
22 July
With qualifying standard of 6.30 (Q) or at least the 12 best performers (q) advance to the Final

Summary

Details
With qualifying standard of 6.30 (Q) or at least the 12 best performers (q) advance to the Final

Group A
23 July
Start time; 18:45  Temperature: 27 °C  Humidity: 39 %
End time: 19:54  Temperature: 26 °C  Humidity: 42 %

Group B
23 July
Start time; 18:45  Temperature: 27 °C  Humidity: 39 %
End time: 19:59  Temperature: 26 °C  Humidity: 42 %

Participation
According to an unofficial count, 34 athletes from 25 countries participated in the event.

References

Long jump
Long jump at the World Athletics U20 Championships
2014 in women's athletics